Pristimantis acatallelus, also known as Cauca robber frog,  is a species of frog in the family Strabomantidae. It is endemic to Colombia.

Distribution and habitat
Pristimantis acatallelus is found in the Andes Mountains (Cordillera Central and Occidental) at elevations of between 1000 and 2680 m. It is a very common species found on vegetation in primary and secondary forests and forest edges.

References

acatallelus
Amphibians described in 1983
Amphibians of Colombia
Endemic fauna of Colombia